Cha-13 or No. 13 (Japanese: 第十三號驅潜特務艇) was a No.1-class auxiliary submarine chaser of the Imperial Japanese Navy that served during World War II.

History
She was laid down on 30 January 1942 at the Fukuoka shipyard of the Fukuoka Shipbuilding Co., Ltd. and launched on 28 February 1943. She was completed on 12 March 1943 and assigned to the Sasebo Defense Force, Sasebo Naval District. On 1 June 1943, she was reassigned to support Army operations in the South Pacific and order to proceed to Rabaul.

She was removed from the Navy List on 30 April 1944.

References

1943 ships
Maritime incidents in November 1943
World War II shipwrecks in the Pacific Ocean
No.1-class auxiliary submarine chasers
Auxiliary ships of the Imperial Japanese Navy